Karen Hill may refer to:

 Karen Friedman Hill (born 1946), wife of American mobster Henry Hill
 Karen Hill (television writer) (active 2004), Canadian television writer

See also 
 Karen Hills, a hill range in eastern Burma
 Hill (surname)